Kathrin Neimke (18 July 1966 in Magdeburg, Saxony-Anhalt), is a German track and field athlete. During the 1980s and 1990s, she was one of the world's best in the shot put.  Until 1990 she represented East Germany.  She won two Olympic medals, the first a silver medal at the 1988 Summer Olympics in Seoul, and the second a bronze at the 1992 Summer Olympics in Barcelona.

Neimke represented SC Magdeburg and trained with Klaus Schneider.  She is 1.80 meters tall and during her active career she weighed 95 kilograms.  She has a degree in sales and at the end of her sporting career she had a job as reproduction photographer at a daily newspaper.  After that she went to the Saxony-Anhalt police.

International competitions

References

1966 births
Living people
Sportspeople from Magdeburg
East German female shot putters
German female shot putters
Olympic athletes of East Germany
Athletes (track and field) at the 1988 Summer Olympics
Olympic athletes of Germany
Athletes (track and field) at the 1992 Summer Olympics
Athletes (track and field) at the 1996 Summer Olympics
World Athletics Championships medalists
European Athletics Championships medalists
World Athletics Championships athletes for East Germany
World Athletics Championships athletes for Germany
Medalists at the 1992 Summer Olympics
Medalists at the 1988 Summer Olympics
Olympic silver medalists for East Germany
Olympic bronze medalists for Germany
Olympic silver medalists in athletics (track and field)
Olympic bronze medalists in athletics (track and field)
Universiade medalists in athletics (track and field)
Universiade silver medalists for East Germany
World Athletics Indoor Championships winners
Medalists at the 1987 Summer Universiade